Mount Swan is a mountain 4 nautical miles (7 km) south of Gutenko Nunataks in the Ford Ranges, Marie Byrd Land. Discovered and mapped by the United States Antarctic Service (USAS) (1939–41). Named by Advisory Committee on Antarctic Names (US-ACAN) for Paul Swan, airplane pilot with the Byrd Antarctic Expedition (1933–35).

Mountains of Marie Byrd Land